Angola and Israel established diplomatic relations in 1993. In 1995, Israel opened an embassy in Luanda and in 2000, Angola opened an embassy in Tel Aviv.

History

The Israeli government aided the National Liberation Front of Angola in 1963 and 1969, during the Angolan War of Independence. In the 1960s, Holden Roberto, head of the NFLA, visited Israel and FNLA members were sent to Israel for training. In the 1970s, Israel  shipped arms to the FNLA through Zaire. 

The Israeli embassy in Luanda opened in 1995, and Tamar Golan, who had worked to maintain Israeli contacts with African countries in the previous decades, was appointed the Israeli ambassador. Tamar Golan left this post in 2002, but returned to Angola later on upon the request of the Angolan President José Eduardo dos Santos to help establish a taskforce, under the auspices of the UN, for the removal of landmines. The Israeli company "Geomine" provided Angola with mine detecting equipment, in order to facilitate their removal. 

President Dos Santos visited Israel in 2005. In March 2006, the trade volume between the two countries amounted to $400 million. 

In 2010, the Angolan government refused to receive openly gay Isi Yanouka as the new ambassador due to his sexuality.

In August 2012, the Angolan president took a three-day visit to Jerusalem, where the governments of Angola and Israel ratified an agreement in Tel Aviv  to strengthen the bonds between both countries.  Israeli President Shimon Peres said that this should be based on the fields of science and technology, economy, and security, and the Angolan president expressed the desire to continue with the bilateral cooperation in health, agriculture, science and technology, and the formation of Angolan experts.

See also
 Arcadi Gaydamak
 Angolagate

References

External links
 Israeli Ambassador Highlights Relations With Angola Angola Press

 
Israel 
Bilateral relations of Israel